Pace High School may refer to:
Pace University High School, New York, New York
Pace High School (Florida), Pace, Florida
Pace High School (Texas), Brownsville, Texas
Pace Alternative High School, Tucson, Arizona
Pace Preparatory Academy (Camp Verde, Arizona), Camp Verde, Arizona
Pace Preparatory Academy (Humboldt, Arizona), Dewey-Humboldt, Arizona
Pace Preparatory Academy (Prescott Valley, Arizona), Prescott Valley, Arizona
Pace School, West Springfield, Massachusetts
Monsignor Edward Pace High School, Opa Locka, Florida